Hawks' sportive lemur (Lepilemur tymerlachsoni), also known as the Nosy Be sportive lemur or Nosy Be weasel lemur, is a sportive lemur endemic to Madagascar.

The name honors the Howard and Rhonda Hawk family. Originally named L. tymerlachsoni, the name was corrected to L. tymerlachsonorum in 2009. However, this correction was based on the incorrect assumption that the name was based on a husband and wife team. Because the name is a compilation of bits of names, the original singular form was correct.

References

Sportive lemurs
Endemic fauna of Madagascar
Mammals of Madagascar
Critically endangered fauna of Africa
Mammals described in 2006